Very may refer to:
 English's prevailing intensifier

Businesses 
 The Very Group, a British retail/consumer finance corporation
 Very (online retailer), their main e-commerce brand
 VERY TV, a Thai television channel

Places 
 Véry, a commune in Meuse department, France
 Very (lunar crater), on the Moon
 Very (Martian crater), on Mars

Music 
 Very (Pet Shop Boys album), 1993
 Very (Dreamscape album), 1999
 Very, an album by Miki Furukawa, 2010

People 
 Edward Wilson Very (1847–1910), US Navy officer, inventor of the Very flare gun
 Frank Washington Very (1852–1927), American astronomer
 Jones Very (1813–1880), American poet, essayist, clergyman and mystic
 Lydia Louisa Anna Very (1823–1901), American author and illustrator
 Pierre Véry (1900–1960), French novelist and screenwriter
 Very Idham Henyansyah (born 1978), Indonesian serial killer

Other uses 
 Very, the most common type of flare gun

See also 
 Vary, a village in Ukraine
Vari (disambiguation)
 Verree, a given name and surname
 Verey, a surname